Arch Hall may refer to:

 Arch Hall (horse), a Canadian thoroughbred racehorse
 Arch Hall Sr. (1908–1978), American actor, writer, and film producer
 Arch Hall Jr., American actor, musician, airline pilot, and author
 Archibald Hall (1924–2002), British murderer and thief